The Hyderabadi pickle is a type of Indian pickle originating from Hyderabad, Telangana, India. The pickle can come in various flavours, from a delicate mixed assortment of fruits (most notably mangos) and vegetables matured through natural processes, and carefully selected spices made and preserved in a traditional method.

See also
 Indian cuisine
 Hyderabadi cuisine
 Sindhi cuisine

References

Indian cuisine
Hyderabadi cuisine
Indian pickles
Indian condiments
Pakistani condiments
Pakistani cuisine
Sindhi cuisine
Hyderabad District, Pakistan
Pakistani pickles